The Miller-Cory House is located in Westfield, Union County, New Jersey, United States. The house was built in 1740 and was added to the National Register of Historic Places on November 3, 1972.

See also 
 National Register of Historic Places listings in Union County, New Jersey
 List of museums in New Jersey

References

External links

Houses on the National Register of Historic Places in New Jersey
Houses completed in 1720
Houses in Union County, New Jersey
Museums in Union County, New Jersey
Living museums in New Jersey
Historic house museums in New Jersey
National Register of Historic Places in Union County, New Jersey
Westfield, New Jersey
New Jersey Register of Historic Places
1720 establishments in New Jersey